Parakkamabahu IV was King of Dambadeniya in the 14th century, who was also a scholar known as Pandit Parakramabahu. He built a temple for the Tooth Relic at Kurunegala and was responsible for writing Dhaladha Siritha, a book that laid down procedures for uninterrupted conduct of paying homage to the sacred relic. He renamed Mahanuwara (Kandy/මහනුවර) as Senkadagala. He extended patronage to Vijayaba Pirivena, Asgiriya Temple, and Sri Ghanananda Pirivena. He succeeded his father Bhuvanaikabahu II as King of Dambadeniya and was succeeded by Bhuvanaikabahu III.

See also
 List of Sri Lankan monarchs
 History of Sri Lanka

References

External links
 Kings & Rulers of Sri Lanka
 Codrington's Short History of Ceylon

Monarchs of Dambadeniya
House of Siri Sanga Bo
P
 Sinhalese Buddhist monarchs
P